Varpol is a village in Kashkan Rural District, Shahivand District, Dowreh County, Lorestan Province, Iran. At the 2006 census, its population was 300, in 69 families.

References 

Towns and villages in Dowreh County